Meyrick is a surname and given name. Meyricke is a variant form.

Surname
 Edmund Meyrick (1636–1713), Welsh cleric 
 Edward Meyrick (1854–1938), English schoolmaster and amateur entomologist
 Edward Meyrick Goulburn (1818–1897), English churchman
 Frederick Meyrick (1827–1906), Church of England clergyman and author
 Gelli Meyrick (1556?–1601), Welsh supporter of Robert Devereux, 2nd Earl of Essex, and conspirator in Essex's rebellion
 John Meyrick (ambassador) (c.1559–1638/9), English ambassador to Russia
 John Meyrick (bishop) (1538–1599), English Anglican bishop
 John Meyrick (politician) (1674–?), Welsh politician and judge
 Jonathan Meyrick (born 1952), British Anglican bishop and dean
 Kate Meyrick (1875–1933), Irish night club owner
 Maurice Meyricke (–1640), Welsh academic
 Rowland Meyrick (1505–1566), Welsh bishop 
 Samuel Rush Meyrick (1783–1848), English inventor
 Sidney Meyrick (1879–1973), Royal Navy officer
 William Meyrick (1808–1846), English cricketer

Given name
 Meyrick Alexander (born 1952), British bassoonist
 Meyrick Edward Clifton James (1898–1963), English actor and soldier
 Meyrick Pringle (born 1966), South African cricketer

See also
 Merrick (disambiguation)
 Meyrick family
 Meyrick Park